Euterpnosia is a genus of cicada native to the island of Formosa, the Ryukyu Archipelago, Japan, Hainan and mainland Asia - China, Bhutan, Nepal and Vietnam. The type species is Euterpnosia chibensis Matsumura, 1917.  Until 2013 this genus was placed in the subtribe Leptopsaltriina, but is now considered typical of the Euterpnosiina Lee, 2013.

Species
 Euterpnosia alpina Chen, 2005
 Euterpnosia ampla Chen, 2006
 Euterpnosia arisana Kato, 1925
 Euterpnosia chibensis (ja) Matsumura, 1917
 Euterpnosia chishingsana Chen & Shiao, 2008
 Euterpnosia crowfooti Distant, 1912 (originally Terpnosia crowfooti) mentioned by Hayashi
 Euterpnosia hohoguro Kato, 1933 possibly a variant of Euterpnosia viridifrons
 Euterpnosia hoppo (zh) Matsumura, 1917 Euterpnosia sozanensis Kato, 1925 is a junior synonym.
 Euterpnosia koshunensis Kato, 1927
 Euterpnosia kotoshoensis Kato, 1925
 Euterpnosia laii Lee, 2003
 Euterpnosia latacauta Chen & Shiao, 2008
 Euterpnosia madawdawensis Chen, 2005
 Euterpnosia madhava Distant, 1881 mentioned by Hayashi
 Euterpnosia olivacea Kato, 1927
 Euterpnosia ruida Lei & Chou, 1997
 Euterpnosia suishana Kato, 1930
 Euterpnosia varicolor Kato, 1926
 (synonyms) Euterpnosia elongata Lee, 2003
 (synonyms) Euterpnosia gina Kato, 1931
 Euterpnosia viridifrons Matsumura, 1917

Others named Euterpnosia
The following are either not Euterpnosia, or there is insufficient information to make a determination as to their current status.
 Euterpnosia chinensis Kato from T'ien Mu-shan, publication not known
 Euterpnosia inanulata Kishida, 1929 was a female Leptosemia takanonis.
 Euterpnosia iwasakii Matsumura, 1913?, locale Ryukyu Archipelago, publication not known
 Euterpnosia okinawana authority not known, locale Ryukyu Archipelago, publication not known
 Euterpnosia sinensis Chen, locale not known, publication not known

Notes

References
 
 
 
  
 
 
 
 
 
 
 
 
 
 

 
Insects of Asia
Auchenorrhyncha genera
Taxa named by Shōnen Matsumura
Leptopsaltriini
Cicadidae genera